Serratia proteamaculans is a Gram-negative, facultatively anaerobic, rod-shaped bacterium. S. proteamaculans HY-3 isolated from the digestive tract of a spider produces an extracellular protease named arazyme, with an estimated molecular mass of 51.5 kDa.

External links
Type strain of Serratia proteamaculans at BacDive -  the Bacterial Diversity Metadatabase

Bacteria described in 1919
Enterobacterales